Mill Run is a ghost town in Tucker County, West Virginia, United States. Mill Run appeared on Soil Conservation Service maps as late as 1921.

References

Geography of Tucker County, West Virginia
Ghost towns in West Virginia